Bunbury may refer to:

Places
 Bunbury, Cheshire, England

Australia
Bunbury, South Australia, a locality
Bunbury Conservation Reserve, a protected area in South Australia.
 Bunbury, Western Australia, a city in Western Australia
 Bunbury, Western Australia (suburb), the suburb containing the city centre
 Bunbury port, in Vittoria, Western Australia
 Bunbury Airport
 City of Bunbury, the local government area
 Electoral district of Bunbury, a single-member electorate represented in the Western Australian Legislative Assembly

People
 Bunbury (surname)
 Bunbury baronets
 The Bunburys, a short-lived supergroup including Eric Clapton and the Bee Gees

Other uses
 Bunbury Festival (cricket), an under-15s cricket festival organised by the England and Wales Cricket Board
 Bunbury Music Festival, a music festival in Cincinnati, Ohio, US
 HMAS Bunbury, two ships of the Royal Australian Navy
 Baron Forrest of Bunbury, a never-officially-created title that was to have been bestowed on John Forrest
 Bunbury, a fictional character in Oscar Wilde's comedy The Importance of Being Earnest
 Bunbury, a fictional place in the Quadling Country of L. Frank Baum's Land of Oz

See also
 Bunburying